Joey Dedio (born September 11, 1963) is an American actor of Puerto Rican and Italian descent.

Early life
Dedio was born in New York City on September 11, 1963.

Career
While in his 20s, Dedio appeared in the NBC soap opera Another World and the television version of The Karate Kid, as the voice of Daniel LaRusso. He provided the voice of lead character Wheeler in the environmentalist cartoon show Captain Planet and the Planeteers. He voiced a drug dealer in an anti-drug special Cartoon All-Stars to the Rescue, which was introduced by then-President George H. W. Bush and his wife, First Lady Barbara Bush.

His other voice roles include Pound Puppies and the Legend of Big Paw, Extreme Ghostbusters and Denver, the Last Dinosaur.

He later appeared in Sunset Beach and guest starred on Law & Order and Chicago Hope. In theatres, he appeared in off Broadway productions like SoHo Reps Skin and workshopped for Joe Pintauro's Broadway bound The Dead Boy. He has appeared in over fifteen films including L.A. Rules, Somewhere in the City, Where the Day Takes You, Timelock (1996), The Last Great Ride, Queenie in Love, A Good Night to Die, Strays
and Trick.

In 2004 he starred in and associate produced Bomb the System.
Dedio's first screenplay titled Downtown: A Street Tale was completed in 2006.

Dedio then co-produced the documentary The Providence Effect about the school Providence St. Mel, where President Obama was a community organizer before becoming President of the United States. Dedio then starred opposite Academy Award winner Melissa Leo in the South African drama Lullaby directed by Academy Award nominee Darryl Roodt.

In 2013 Dedio produced the film Musical Chairs directed by Academy Award nominee Susan Seidelman. The film earned the producers a GLADD nomination for Best Feature.

Dedio then wrote and starred in the title role of the hit award-winning film Tio Papi. Dedio was nominated as Best Actor at the 2013 Imagen Awards for his portrayal of Ray Ray Dominguez as well as receiving a key to the city of Miami and Miami Beach for his work on the project. Dedio's next film was the cult classic 36 Saints.

Filmography

Film

Television

References

External links
 

1963 births
Living people
American male film actors
Film producers from New York (state)
American male television actors
American male voice actors
Male actors from New York City
Puerto Rican male actors
American people of Italian descent
American people of Puerto Rican descent